Rhaphuma fulgurata is a species of longhorn beetle in the family Cerambycidae, found in southern Asia. This species has two subspecies, Rhaphuma fulgurata bhutanica Holzschuh, 2003, and Rhaphuma fulgurata fulgurata.

References

Clytini
Beetles of Asia
Beetles described in 2003